Givat Harel is an Israeli settlement established in 1998. It is under the jurisdiction of the Mateh Binyamin Regional Council in the northern West Bank, north of Nahal Shilo. Givat Harel is situated just off Highway 60 on a hill between Eli and Shilo.

The international community considers Israeli settlements in the West Bank illegal under international law, but the Israeli government disputes this.

History
According to ARIJ, land was  "forcefully seized by Israeli settlers" from the Palestinian village of Sinjil in order to construct Givat Harel.

The road to Givat Harel was paved by the Netanyahu government when Ariel Sharon served as minister of national infrastructures. 

In July 2012, the IDF fired into the air to disperse settlers from Givat Harel and Palestinians from the neighboring town of Sinjil. A clash erupted when settlers met for prayers at the entrance to the town. The settlers say that Sinjil villagers are farming state land in an attempt to take control of it, while the authorities maintain that the property belongs to Sinjil.

References

External links
Givat Harel website
Givat Harel altar (Hebrew) 

Religious Israeli settlements
Mateh Binyamin Regional Council
Populated places established in 1998